Seán Redmond Etchingham (27 March 1868 – 23 April 1923) was an Irish Sinn Féin politician.

He was born in the townland of Ballintray, Courtown, County Wexford, one of five children of John Etchingham, described as a coachman, servant or butler, and Elizabeth (Bessie) Redmond, both of whom were also from County Wexford. Like four of his siblings, his surname was recorded as Hutchingham in the birth register, although the family is referred to as Etchingham in most official documents.

In 1901, he was living in Church Lane, Gorey, where he was employed as a horse trainer. By 1911, he was back in Courtown, where he gave his profession as journalist in the census of that year.

He became a member of the Irish Volunteers, Sinn Féin, the Gaelic League and the Irish Republican Brotherhood (IRB). He never married.

He was jailed in 1916 for his part in the Enniscorthy raid to seize the railway and to prevent reinforcements reaching Dublin to put down the Easter Rising. When the Dublin rising failed, Etchingham surrendered and was arrested, but released in the amnesty of 1917.

He was first elected as a Sinn Féin candidate for Wicklow East at the 1918 general election. As with the other Sinn Féin MPs, he did not take his seat in the British House of Commons, sitting instead in the revolutionary First Dáil, which met in the Mansion House, Dublin in January 1919.

He was later appointed to the government as Secretary for Fisheries. In May 1921 his residence at Courtown was destroyed by the Black and Tans. He was returned unopposed in the 1921 general election and opposed the Anglo-Irish Treaty in the Dáil debates and again at the Volunteer Executive. He lost his Dáil seat in the 1922 election. 

After several months in a Dublin nursing home he returned to Courtown, where he died on 23 April 1923.

References

External links

1868 births
1923 deaths
People from County Wexford
Early Sinn Féin TDs
Members of the 1st Dáil
Members of the 2nd Dáil
Members of the Irish Republican Brotherhood
UK MPs 1918–1922
Members of the Parliament of the United Kingdom for County Wicklow constituencies (1801–1922)